Dasrathpur is a small village in Mansurchak Block in Begusarai District of Bihar State, India. It comes under Dasrathpur Panchayath. It belongs to Darbhanga Division. It is located 39 km north of district headquarters Begusarai. It is 2 km from Mansurchak. 
Dasrathpur Pin code is 851128, and the postal head office is Mansurchak.

References

Villages in Begusarai district